Eudonia submarginalis is a species of moth in the family Crambidae. It was described by Francis Walker in 1863. It is endemic to New Zealand.

The larvae of this species feed on lichens, bryophytes and grasses. Adults of the species have been observed visiting the flowers of Leptospermum scoparium, Olearia virgata, Helichrysum intermedium and Dracophyllum acerosum likely feeding from and pollinating them.

References

Eudonia
Moths of New Zealand
Moths described in 1863
Endemic fauna of New Zealand
Taxa named by Francis Walker (entomologist)
Endemic moths of New Zealand